Third Ukrainian Republic may refer to:

A non-parliamentary movement in Ukraine founded by  Yuriy Lutsenko
Third Ukrainian Republic (party), a political party in Ukraine

See also
Third Republic (disambiguation)